Ghowchak (Pashto:  غوچک Ghowchak) is a village in Surkh-Rod District in Nangarhar province in Afghanistan, 20 km east of Jalalabad city near the Jwe Haft. Its population is 3,000 (2002 official estimate).

See also 
Nangarhar Province

Populated places in Nangarhar Province